Descoberto (lit. Discovered) is a municipality in the Brazilian State of Minas Gerais.  It has a population of approximately 5,029 inhabitants.

References

Municipalities in Minas Gerais